Dareen (دارين) is an Arabic feminine given name which means 'nugget of wisdom
'. Notable people with the surname include:
 
Dareen Abu Ghaida (born 1985), Canadian journalist
Dareen Tatour (born c. 1982), Palestinian poet and photographer 

Arabic feminine given names